In Greek mythology, Dolos or Dolus (Ancient Greek: Δόλος "Deception") is the spirit of trickery. He is also a master at cunning deception, craftiness, and treachery. Dolos is an apprentice of the Titan Prometheus and a companion of the Pseudea (Lies). His female counterpart is Apate, who is the goddess  of fraud and deception. His Roman equivalent is Mendacius. There are even some stories of Dolos tricking gods into lies.

Family 
Dolus was either the son of the primordial deities Gaia (Earth) and Aether (Air) or Erebus (Darkness) and Nyx (Night).

Hyginus' account 
From Aether (Air) and Terra/ Gaia (Earth) [were born]: Dolor (Pain), Dolus (Guile), Ira/ Lyssa (Anger), Luctus/ Penthus (Lamentation), Mendacium/ Pseudologoi (Lies), Jusjurandum/ Horcus (Oath), Ultio/ Poine (Vengeance), Intemperantia (Intemperance), Altercatio/ Amphillogiai (Altercation), Oblivio/ Lethe (Forgetfulness), Socordia/ Aergia (Sloth), Timor/ Phobos (Fear), Superbia (Arrogance), Incestum (Sacrilege), Pugna/ Hysminai (Combat).

Cicero's account 
Their [Aether and Hemera's] brothers and sisters, whom the ancient genealogists name Amor/ Eros (Love), Dolus (Guile), Metus/ Deimos (Fear), Labor/ Ponus (Toil), Invidentia/ Nemesis (Envy), Fatum/ Moros (Fate), Senectus/ Geras (Old Age), Mors/ Thanatos (Death), Tenebrae/ Keres (Darkness), Miseria/ Oizys (Misery), Querella/ Momus (Complaint), Gratia/ Philotes (Favour), Fraus/ Apate (Fraud), Pertinacia (Obstinacy), the Parcae/ Moirai (Fates), the Hesperides, the Somnia/ Oneiroi (Dreams): all of these are fabled to be the children of Erebus (Darkness) and Nox/ Nyx (Night).

Mythology 
Dolos became known for his skill when he attempted to make a fraudulent copy statue of Aletheia (Veritas), in order to trick people into thinking they were seeing the real statue.  He ran out of the clay he was using to create the statue, and had to leave the feet unfinished as he quaked in fear while his skill-master looked over his attempt at deceitfulness. To his surprise, Prometheus was rather amazed at the similarity between the statues, so Dolos then became a master at his crafty and tricky ways.Prometheus, that potter who gave shape to our new generation, decided one day to sculpt the form of Veritas (Truth) [Aletheia], using all his skill so that she would be able to regulate people's behaviour. As he was working, an unexpected summons from mighty Jupiter [Zeus] called him away. Prometheus left cunning Dolus (Trickery) in charge of his workshop, Dolus had recently become one of the god's apprentices. Fired by ambition, Dolus (Trickery) used the time at his disposal to fashion with his sly fingers a figure of the same size and appearance as Veritas (Truth) [Aletheia] with identical features. When he had almost completed the piece, which was truly remarkable, he ran out of clay to use for her feet. The master returned, so Dolus (Trickery) quickly sat down in his seat, quaking with fear. Prometheus was amazed at the similarity of the two statues and wanted it to seem as if all the credit were due to his own skill. Therefore, he put both statues in the kiln and when they had been thoroughly baked, he infused them both with life: sacred Veritas (Truth) walked with measured steps, while her unfinished twin stood stuck in her tracks. That forgery, that product of subterfuge, thus acquired the name of Mendacium [Pseudologos, Falsehood], and I readily agree with people who say that she has no feet: every once in a while something that is false can start off successfully, but with time Veritas (Truth) is sure to prevail.

Notes

References 

 Gaius Julius Hyginus, Fabulae from The Myths of Hyginus translated and edited by Mary Grant. University of Kansas Publications in Humanistic Studies. Online version at the Topos Text Project.
 Marcus Tullius Cicero, Nature of the Gods from the Treatises of M.T. Cicero translated by Charles Duke Yonge (1812-1891), Bohn edition of 1878. Online version at the Topos Text Project.
 Marcus Tullius Cicero, De Natura Deorum. O. Plasberg. Leipzig. Teubner. 1917.  Latin text available at the Perseus Digital Library.

Greek trickster deities
Personifications in Greek mythology
Children of Gaia
Children of Nyx
Greek gods